Somatidia crassipes is a species of beetle in the family Cerambycidae. It was described by Broun in 1883. It is known from New Zealand.

References

crassipes
Beetles described in 1883